In Retrospect may refer to:

Albums
In Retrospect, by Cleo Laine, released in 1990
In Retrospect (Nichols and May album), released in 1962
In Retrospect, by The Toasters, released in 2003
In Retrospect (Mal Waldron album), released in 1982

Other
 In Retrospect: The Tragedy and Lessons of Vietnam (1995), a memoir by Robert McNamara

See also
 Retrospect (disambiguation)
 Retrospective (disambiguation)